The 2016–17 FC Krasnodar season was the 6th successive season that the club played in the Russian Premier League, the highest tier of association football in Russia. They finished the season in 4th place, reaching the quarterfinals of the Russian Cup and the Round of 16 of the Europa League.

Season Events
On 13 September 2016, Oleg Kononov resigned as manager, with Igor Shalimov taking over as caretaker manager before being appointed the team's permanent manager on 6 October.

Squad

Out on loan

Reserve squad

Transfers

Summer

In:

Out:

Winter

In:

Out:

Competitions

Russian Premier League

Results by round

Matches

League table

Russian Cup

UEFA Europa League

Qualifying rounds

Group stage

Knockout stage

Squad statistics

Appearances and goals

|-
|colspan="14"|Players away from the club on loan:

|-
|colspan="14"|Players who left Krasnodar during the season:

|}

Goal Scorers

Disciplinary record

Notes

References

FC Krasnodar seasons
Krasnodar
Krasnodar